Henrik Visnapuu ( – 3 April 1951) was a well-known Estonian poet and dramatist.

Life
Henrik Visnapuu was born in Helme Parish, Viljandi County, Livonia. He first attended the village school in Reola (today in Ülenurme Parish) and college  in Sipe (today in Kambja Parish) and the municipal school in Tartu. In 1907, he graduated from the grammar school in Narva after taking final exams in education and taught at various schools as a  primary school teacher. By 1912 he moved to Tartu and taught Estonian literature at the local high school for girls. At the same time he attended lectures in philosophy at the University of Tartu. 
Visnapuu worked since 1917 as a journalist at the Tallinna Teataja, then until 1935 he worked as a freelance journalist and author. From 1935 to 1944 he was culture secretary in the department of the Information Agency of the Estonian state. 
With the approaching Soviet occupation of Estonia and the return of the Red Army, Henrik Visnapuu fled to Germany in 1944 and in 1949 moved to the United States, where he died on Long Island, New York.

Work
Henrik Visnapuu first published his lyrical works in 1908. He was one of the most important Estonian poets in the 1920s and 1930s, until the end of Estonian independence and the return of the Soviet Russian regime, when he was forced to go into exile. Besides Marie Under, he was one of the most influential members of the literary group "Siuru" (founded in 1917), which was strongly influenced by Symbolism. Henrik Visnapuu's poems are mainly of the futuristic and expressionistic genre.

Death
Visnapuu died, aged 61, in Long Island, New York, United States.

Bibliography

 Amores (1917)
 Jumalaga, Ene! (1918)
 Talihari (1920)
 Hõbedased kuljused (1920)
 Käoorvik (1920)
 Ränikivi (1925)
 Maarjamaa laulud (1927)
 Puuslikud (1929)
 Tuulesõel (1931)
 Päike ja jõgi (1932)
 Põhjavalgus (1938)
 Tuule-ema (1942)
 Esivanemate hauad (1946)
 Ad astra (1947)
 Periheel. Ingi raamat (1947)
 Mare Balticum (1948)
 Linnutee (1950)

Miscellaneous 

 Visnapuu's poems were used by composer Eduard Tubin in his "Requiem for Fallen Soldiers" (1979)

References

External links
 Miksike.ee (Estonian)

1890 births
1951 deaths
People from Tõrva Parish
People from the Governorate of Livonia
Estonian dramatists and playwrights
Estonian male poets
Estonian World War II refugees
Estonian emigrants to the United States
20th-century Estonian poets
20th-century dramatists and playwrights
Male dramatists and playwrights
20th-century male writers
University of Tartu alumni